Amaurobius crassipalpis is a species of spider in the family Amaurobiidae, found in Germany, Switzerland and Italy.

References

crassipalpis
Spiders of Europe
Spiders described in 1870